Greenstone Point is a high rock spur along the north front of the Jones Mountains of Antarctica, immediately east of Austin Valley. It was mapped by the University of Minnesota – Jones Mountains Party, 1960–61, and so named by them because of the greenish color of the rock.

References

Headlands of Ellsworth Land